James Kenneth Leitch (born 11 August 1945) is a former Australian rules footballer who played for Melbourne in the VFL during the mid 1960s. He later played in Tasmania and represented the state in interstate matches.

Early career
A wingman, Leitch made his debut for Melbourne against St Kilda in their premiership year of 1964 but didn't play in the finals. He played ten matches in 1965, having his most successful effort with four goals as a half-forward flanker against Essendon in Round 10.

Success in Tasmania
He later played for Northern Tasmanian Football Association club Scottsdale and was a member of four premiership teams. Leitch represented Tasmania at the 1972 Perth Carnival where he was so prominent that he was chosen in the All-Australian team.

Honours and achievements
Team
NTFA Premiership
 Scottsdale 1968, 1970, 1971, 1973

Individual
 All Australian 1972
 NTFA Best & Fairest 1971 (2nd on count-back)
 club Best & Fairest - Scottsdale (1st) 1969, (3rd) 1966

References

Holmesby, Russell and Main, Jim (2007). The Encyclopedia of AFL Footballers. 7th ed. Melbourne: Bas Publishing.

External links

1945 births
Australian rules footballers from Victoria (Australia)
Melbourne Football Club players
Scottsdale Football Club players
All-Australians (1953–1988)
Living people
Tasmanian Football Hall of Fame inductees